Fader is a surname. Notable people with the surname include:

Douglas Fader, Canadian Cross of Valour recipient
Fernando Fader (1882–1935), French-born Argentine painter
Julie Fader, Canadian musician, songwriter and visual artist
Paul T. Fader (1959-2017), American lawyer  and politician
Peter Fader, American academic